This is the list of the 6 appointed members of the European Parliament for Cyprus from 1 May 2004 (following Cyprus' accession to the European Union) until 1 July 2004 (when the newly elected MEPs, assumed their duties following the first European Parliament Elections held in Cyprus on 13 June 2004).

List

References 

2004
List
Cyprus
Cyprus